The Southeastern Massachusetts Law Enforcement Council, sometimes called "SEMLEC," is a regional mutual aid facilitator formed by thirty police agencies in southeastern Massachusetts. It pools resources to provide SWAT, mobile operations, search and rescue, dive teams, color guards, and other units throughout the area.

Agencies that belong to SEMLEC include:

 Acushnet Police Department
 Berkley Police Department
 Bridgewater Police Department
 Bridgewater State University Police Department
 Carver Police Department
 Dartmouth Police Department
 Dighton Police Department
 East Bridgewater Police Department
 Fairhaven Police Department
 Freetown Police Department
 Halifax Police Department
 Hanson Police Department
 Kingston Police Department
 Lakeville Police Department
 Mattapoisett Police Department
 Marion Police Department
 Middleborough Police Department
 New Bedford Police Department
 Pembroke Police Department
 Plympton Police Department
 Raynham Police Department
 Rehoboth Police Department
 Rochester Police Department
 Seekonk Police Department
 Somerset Police Department
 Swansea Police Department
 Taunton Police Department
 Wareham Police Department
 West Bridgewater Police Department
 Westport Police Department
 Whitman Police Department

References

Law enforcement in Massachusetts